Rising, stylised as RISING, is a city-wide arts festival held in Melbourne, Australia. It is supported by the Victoria State Government.

History
Rising was announced in May 2020 as Melbourne’s new major arts and culture festival, taking the place of the Melbourne International Arts Festival and White Night. RISING is led by co-artistic directors Hannah Fox and Gideon Obarzanek.

Rising’s inaugural festival, scheduled to take place in August 2020, was delayed by the Covid-19 pandemic and postponed into 2021.

Rising’s rescheduled program was announced in March 2021. For its headline event, Rising commissioned the new exhibition A Miracle Constantly Repeated by Patricia Piccinini. The exhibition was the first large-scale opening of Flinders Street Station's ballroom to the public in decades. The program also included  new commissions from Australian and International artists and companies including Reko Rennie, Chunky Move, Jenny Holzer, Maree Clarke and Dancenorth, among others. 

Scheduled to run from 26 May—6 June 2021, Rising’s program was paused on 27 May as a result of Melbourne’s citywide lockdown in response to the ongoing COVID-19 pandemic.

While there had been plans to revive the festival in June, as Melbourne's lockdown was extended the festival directors made the decision to cancel Rising. Public works such as The Rivers Sing by Deborah Cheetham, Byron J. Scullin and Thomas Supple, Ancestral Memory by Maree Clarke and Mitch Mahoney, and Wandering Stars by The Lantern Company remained available. Rising also commissioned the ongoing Melbourne Art Trams project, and engaged First Nations artists to design six trams which had been unveiled in May.

In November 2021, Patricia Piccinini's exhibition in Flinders Street Station was reopened to the public and is scheduled to run until June 2022.

The 2022 program, announced in March, will run from 1—12 June 2022, featuring a mixture of new work and others which had been previously postponed.

Awards and nominations

Music Victoria Awards
The Music Victoria Awards are an annual awards night celebrating Victorian music. They commenced in 2006.

! 
|-
| 2022
| Rising
| Best Metro Festival
| 
| 
|-

References 

Arts festivals in Australia
Festivals established in 2021